Narankari Bazaar is a bazaar located in Rawalpindi.

History
The bazaar got name after the Narankari ethinic group of Sikh people.

Nirankaris are those who believe in formless God. Nirankaris emphasize that God is omnipresent but has no form or form.

A namesake Gurdwara Nirankari Gurdwara is also there.

References

Further reading
Khan, Ali (2015). Rawul Pindee: The Raj Years 

Shopping districts and streets in Pakistan
Tourist attractions in Rawalpindi
Populated places in Rawalpindi City
Rawalpindi City
Bazaars in Rawalpindi